"Erilaiset" is a song by Finnish singer Robin. Released on 16 October 2013, the song serves as the second single from Robin's third studio album Boom Kah. The song peaked at number one on the Finnish Singles Chart.

Chart performance

References

2013 singles
Robin (singer) songs
Finnish-language songs
Number-one singles in Finland
2013 songs